Dwyer may refer to:

Places in the United States
Dwyer, Mississippi
Dwyer, New Mexico
Dwyer, Wyoming

Other uses
Dwyer (name), a surname
Dwyer Arena
Dwyer Hill Road
Dwyer Brothers Stable
Dwyer Stadium
Dwyer Stakes
Monsignor Paul Dwyer Catholic High School
William T. Dwyer High School

See also
 Dwyre
 O'Dwyer (disambiguation)